George Millyard (12 November 1814 – 20 July 1848) was an English professional cricketer who played first-class cricket from 1835 to 1842.  He was a cousin of his Sussex colleagues Jem and William Broadbridge.

A left-handed batsman, occasional wicket-keeper and right arm medium pace roundarm bowler who was mainly associated with Sussex, he made 50 known appearances in first-class matches.  He was playing for Sussex when the county club was founded in 1839.  He represented the Players in the Gentlemen v Players series and the South in the North v. South series.

References

1814 births
1848 deaths
English cricketers
English cricketers of 1826 to 1863
North v South cricketers
Players cricketers
Sussex cricketers
People from Petworth
Left-Handed v Right-Handed cricketers
Gentlemen of Sussex cricketers